The 2021 Northwestern State Demons football team represented Northwestern State University as a member of the Southland Conference during the 2021 NCAA Division I FCS football season. Led by fourth-year head coach Brad Laird, the Demons compiled an overall record of 3–8 with a mark of 3–5 in conference play, tying for fourth place in the Southland. Northwestern State played home games at Harry Turpin Stadium in Natchitoches, Louisiana.

Previous season

The Demons finished the 2020–21 season with 1–5 overall record and 1–5 in conference record to finish in the last place in SLC during the shortened season due to the COVID-19 pandemic. As Northwestern State decided to play during the scheduled FCS season in the spring, their schedule only consisted of FCS teams, including all teams who chose to play in the spring from the Southland.'

Preseason

Preseason poll
The Southland Conference released their preseason poll in July 2021. The Demons were picked to finish fifth in the conference. In addition, nine Demons were chosen to the Preseason All-Southland Team.

Preseason All–Southland Teams

Offense

1st Team
Scooter Adams – Running Back, JR

2nd Team
Khalil Corbett-Canada – Offensive Lineman, SR
Jakob Sell – Offensive Lineman, JR
Scotty Roblow – Punter, RS-SO

Defense

1st Team
Jomard Valsin – Linebacker, JR

2nd Team
Ja'Quay Pough – Linebacker, SR
P. J. Herrington – Defensive Back, JR
William Hooper – Defensive Back, JR
Donovan Duvernay – Kick Returner, SR

Schedule

Game summaries

at North Texas

at Alcorn State

UT Martin

at No. 16 Southeastern Louisiana

No. 24 Incarnate Word

at Houston Baptist

McNeese State

No. 9 Southeastern Louisiana

at Nicholls

Houston Baptist

at McNeese State

Personnel

References

Northwestern State
Northwestern State Demons football seasons
Northwestern State Demons football